The Church and School of Wicca was founded by Gavin Frost and Yvonne Frost in 1968. It was the first federally recognized Church of the religion known as Wicca in the United States. It is well known for its correspondence courses on the Frosts' unique interpretation of Wicca. The Church and School are located in Beckley, West Virginia.

History

The Church of Wicca was founded in 1968. Gavin Frost was a British-born aerospace engineer. While working for an aerospace company in southern England's Salisbury Plain—an area replete with prehistoric monuments—he became interested in the druids. His wife Yvonne was an American with a background in Spiritualism. He then claimed to have been initiated into a Wiccan group in St. Louis, Missouri. When living in St. Louis they developed a correspondence course through which to teach others about Wicca, advertising these courses as the "School of Wicca".
They argued that by spreading their religious teaching in the form of a correspondence course, they were reaching a wider range of people than initiatory-based forms of Wicca, and that this would be necessary in order for the religion to become a "strong religious force". They believed strongly that Wicca should be presented publicly, believing that the secrecy observed by some Wiccan group brought mistrust and persecution from wider society.

The Frosts had adopted the term "Wicca" in the late 1960s, when it was gaining increasing usage within the Pagan Witchcraft community as a name for their religion.
The pair resisted using the term "Pagan" until the late 1970s. In 1975, Yvonne stated that "I do not consider myself a Pagan. I do not worship any nature deity. I reach upward to the unnameable which has no gender".

In conjunction with his lawyers, Gavin secured religious recognition for his School from the Internal Revenue Service in 1972; this resulted in his Church becoming the first recognised church of Wicca in the United States. Later that year they began working on their Church and School full time. Gavin appointed himself as its archbishop, and Yvonne as a bishop, and they awarded themselves doctorates of divinity through the Church. The couple moved first to Salem, Missouri—where they ran a pig farm—and then to New Bern, North Carolina in 1974. There they tried to establish a survival community, but it failed to materialise. In he late 1970s they began holding an annual "Samhain Seminar", in which workshops, rituals, and lectures took place, primarily for students of their correspondence course. In 1996 they relocated to Hinton, West Virginia. They subsequently moved to West Virginia in 1993, where Gavin died in 2016.

In 1985 the Church of Wicca were involved in the Dettmer v. Landon case, during which the District Court of Virginia ruled that Wicca constituted a legitimate religion under U.S. law. The Virginia prison authorities appealed the case, and in 1986 Judge J. Butzner of the Federal Appeals Court upheld the original decision. This made the Church of Wicca the only federally recognised Wiccan church to have its status as a religion upheld in a federal appeals court.

Within the American Wiccan and wider modern Pagan community, the Frosts have been at the centre of various disputes, particularly surrounding issues such as homosexuality and theology. The Wiccan Margot Adler suggested that much of this controversy stemmed from Gavin's "wry and rather bizarre sense of humor, and his tendency to say anything to get a rise out of someone", something which she thought had resulted in the Frosts often being "misunderstood". In person, she thought, the Frosts "have always been delightful", with Gavin being "kind and humorous" and Yvonne being "forthright and even a bit prim".

They published a book titled The Witch's Bible, which generated outrage within the Wiccan community. Many critics referred to it as a "Witchcrap book". Many of the central teachings featured in the book—such as its emphasis on the existence of an asexual monotheistic deity—were at total odds with mainstream Wiccan belief. Many Wiccans were angered at the word The as it appeared in the title, presupposing that it carried some form of authority within the Wiccan community. Its comments on race and sex also caused controversy.

Belief and teaching

The Church of Wicca defines Wicca as a monotheistic religion. Gavin expressed the view that there was one God, which was abstract, unknowable, and beyond the need for any worship. This is one of the teachings which distinguishes it from other Wiccan traditions. Unlike many other Wiccan groups, there was no particular emphasis on female divinity or the feminine, with Gavin calling beliefs about ancient matriarchies "a Marxist heresy".

He also expressed belief in "stone gods", "idols" which are created by humans as a storage for energy which can then be utilised for magical purposes.

The Church taught that the astral realm, which they called the "Sidhe", is structured into ten levels. They taught that each human has a soul which undergoes a progressive system of reincarnation through which it can learn. The Frosts' view was that overpopulation had resulted in "inferior souls" incarnating on the earth.

The Church taught kundalini sex practices. These included "introitus", in which sex without orgasm was held as a form of surrender to God.

Impact and legacy

Tens of thousands of students have begun the School's twelve-lesson course in Wicca, although only a few thousand have finished it due to the rigor of the course.
In 2006, the Wiccan journalist Margot Adler suggested that the School of Wicca may have been responsible for the formation of as many as one hundred covens.

Curriculum
The School's curriculum includes classes on a variety of subjects associated both with Wicca as a religion and with occult and metaphysical studies and practices in general. These classes begin with an "Essential Witchcraft" course, which lasts "a year and a day". Other topics include: Advanced Celtic Witchcraft and Shamanism, Astral Travel, Astrology, Graphology, Mystical Awareness, a Natural Wicca Survey Course, Practical Sorcery, Prediction, Psychic and Herbal Healing, and Tantric Yoga. Much of the course of study is available to the student on video.

Charters
The Church and School chartered several other churches and groups. In the early years of the Church, ordination to individuals and sometimes even charters to churches had at times been offered solely on the basis of the Church's correspondence courses. However, due to a few incidents of fraudulent use of Church credentials, misconduct by these individuals, and/or the use of course material to defame the Church and the religion of Wicca, along with public controversy about these instances, this practice was abandoned as of 1976. In some cases, charters have been revoked.

References

Footnotes

Bibliography

Further reading
 Encyclopedia of Wicca & Witchcraft - by Raven Grimassi (September 1, 2000) Llewellyn Publications , 
 The Encyclopedia of Witches & Witchcraft - by Rosemary Ellen Guiley (July 1989) Facts on File , 
 The Encyclopedia of Modern Witchcraft and Neo-Paganism - by Shelley Rabinovitch and James Lewis (October 1, 2002) Citadel , 
 The Witch Book: The Encyclopedia of Witchcraft, Wicca, and Neo-Paganism - By Raymond Buckland (November 1, 2001) Visible Ink Press , 
 The Good Witch’s Bible - by Gavin and Yvonne Frost (December 1999) Godolphin House , 
 People of the Earth: The New Pagans Speak Out - by Lawrence Bond & Ellen Evert Hopman (1996) (reissued as Being a Pagan: Druids, Wiccans & Witches Today in 2002 Destiny Books ) Interview.

External links
Church & School of Wicca official website

Distance education institutions based in the United States
Religion in West Virginia
Religious organizations established in 1968
Educational institutions established in 1968
Wiccan schools in the United States
Modern pagan organizations established in the 1960s